"I Can Never Go Home Anymore" is a song written by Shadow Morton and performed by the Shangri-Las.  It reached #6 on the U.S. pop chart in 1965.  The song was added to their 1965 album Shangri-Las '65 (reissued as I Can Never Go Home Anymore).

The single was arranged by Artie Butler and produced by Shadow Morton.

Lyric content 
A girl threatens to run away if her mother will not allow her to do what she wants, but she is advised against it by another girl (the song's narrator) whose circumstances turned tragic after having done the same. After a heated disagreement with her mother over a boy, the narrator packed some clothes and left home. She forgot about the boy immediately after and thought about her mother's love and care. Before the narrator could return home, her mother died of a broken heart.

Other versions
David Wrench featured Henry Priestman released a version of the song on his 1998 EP David Wrench Sings the Songs of The Shangri-La's.

References

1965 songs
1965 singles
Songs written by Shadow Morton
The Shangri-Las songs
Red Bird Records singles
Song recordings with Wall of Sound arrangements